Rio Acima is a Brazilian municipality located in the state of Minas Gerais. The city belongs to the mesoregion Metropolitana de Belo Horizonte and to the microregion of Belo Horizonte.  As of 2020, the estimated population was 10,420.

The municipality contains almost 20% of the  Serra do Gandarela National Park, created in 2014.

See also
 List of municipalities in Minas Gerais

References

External links
Rio Acima City Wed Site

Municipalities in Minas Gerais